Tonya Cornelisse is an American actress.

Education
Cornelisse earned her BFA in theatre from the New York University Tisch School of Performing Arts along with a degree in psychology.

Career
Cornelisse starred in films like Liminal, Yellow, Lost Time, A Leading Man, Pelé: Birth of a Legend and The Wolves of Savin Hill.

Cornelisse's theater work includes Buried Child, Who's Afraid of Virginia Woolf? and STOP IT!.

Cornelisse provided the audio for the Hidden Series’ audio books.

Filmography

Film

Television

References

External links 
 
 

21st-century American actresses
Tisch School of the Arts alumni
Living people
1981 births